is a Japanese former Nippon Professional Baseball catcher.

References 

1981 births
Living people
Baseball people from Hyōgo Prefecture
Japanese baseball players
Nippon Professional Baseball catchers
Tokyo Yakult Swallows players
Japanese baseball coaches
Nippon Professional Baseball coaches